The Hero may refer to:

Books 
 "The Hero" (poem), a poem written by Rabindranath Tagore
 The Hero (novel), a science fiction novel by John Ringo and Michael Z. Williamson
 The Hero: A Study in Tradition, Myth and Drama, a book by FitzRoy Somerset, 4th Baron Raglan
 "The Hero", a short story by George R. R. Martin and collected in Dreamsongs: A RRetrospective.

Film 
 The Hero (1917 film), an American silent comedy starring Oliver Hardy
 The Hero (1923 film), an American World War I drama directed by Louis J. Gasnier
 The Hero, English language title of Nayak, a 1966 Bengali drama by Satyajit Ray
 The Hero, US title of Bloomfield, a 1971 British-Israeli drama
 The Hero: Love Story of a Spy, a 2003 Bollywood action-adventure
 The Hero (2004 film), an Angolan war drama
 The Hero (2017 film), an American drama starring Sam Elliott

Television 
 The Hero (1966 TV series), a 1966 American television series
 The Hero (2013 TV series), a 2013 American reality television series

Music 
 The Hero (opera), a 1976 opera by Gian Carlo Menotti
 "The Hero", a track on the Amon Amarth album Twilight of the Thunder God
 "The Hero", a song on the 1980 Queen album Flash Gordon
 "The Hero", a track on "The Hero"/"Serious Coin" EP by Nostalgia

See also 
 Hero (disambiguation)
 The Heroes (disambiguation)